The 2013 All-Pac-12 Conference football team consists of American football players chosen by various organizations for All-Pac-12 honors for the 2013 Pac-12 season. The Stanford Cardinal won the conference, defeating the Arizona State Sun Devils 38 to 14 in the Pac-12 Championship game. Stanford then lost to the Big Ten champion Michigan State Spartans in the Rose Bowl 20 to 14. Arizona running back Ka'Deem Carey was voted Pac-12 Offensive Player of the Year. Arizona State defensive tackle Will Sutton was voted Pat Tillman Pac-12 Defensive Player of the Year.

Offensive selections

Quarterbacks
Marcus Mariota, Oregon (Coaches-1)
Taylor Kelly, Arizona St. (2nd)

Running backs
Ka'Deem Carey, Arizona (Coaches-1)
Bishop Sankey, Washington (Coaches-1)
Tyler Gaffney, Stanford (Coaches-2)
Marion Grice, Arizona St. (Coaches-2)

Wide receivers
Brandin Cooks, Oregon St. (Coaches-1)
Paul Richardson, Colorado (Coaches-1)
Ty Montgomery, Stanford (Coaches-2)
Jaelen Strong, Arizona St. (Coaches-2)

Tight ends
Chris Coyle, Arizona St. (Coaches-1)
Austin Seferian-Jenkins, Washington (Coaches-2)

Tackles
Marcus Martin, USC (Coaches-1)
Andrus Peat, Stanford (Coaches-2)
Cameron Fleming, Stanford (Coaches-2)

Guards
David Yankey, Stanford (Coaches-1)
Xavier Su'a-Filo, UCLA (Coaches-1)
Evan Finkenberg, Arizona St. (Coaches-1)
Jamil Douglas, Arizona St. (Coaches-2)
Isaac Seumalo, Oregon St. (Coaches-2)
Khalil Wilkes, Stanford (Coaches-2)

Centers
Hroniss Grasu, Oregon (Coaches-1)

Defensive selections

Ends
Ben Gardner, Stanford (Coaches-1)
Leonard Williams, USC (Coaches-1)
Trevor Reilly, Utah (Coaches-1)
Scott Crichton, Oregon St. (Coaches-2)
Taylor Hart, Oregon (Coaches-2)
Hau'oli Kikaha, Washington (Coaches-2)
Devon Kennard, USC (Coaches-2)
Tenny Palepoi, Utah (Coaches-2)

Tackles
Will Sutton, Arizona St. (Coaches-1)

Linebackers
Anthony Barr, UCLA (Coaches-1)
Trent Murphy, Stanford (Coaches-1)
Shayne Skov, Stanford (Coaches-1)
Carl Bradford, Arizona St. (Coaches-2)
Myles Jack, UCLA (Coaches-2)
Hayes Pullard, USC (Coaches-2)
Chris Young, Arizona St. (Coaches-2)

Cornerbacks
Ifo Ekpre-Olomu, Oregon (Coaches-1)
Alden Darby, Arizona St. (Coaches-1)
Robert Nelson, Arizona St. (Coaches-1)
Marcus Peters, Washington (Coaches-2)
Rashaad Reynolds, Oregon St.  (Coaches-2)
Osahon Irabor, Arizona St. (Coaches-2)

Safeties
Ed Reynolds, Stanford (Coaches-1)
Deone Bucannon, Washington St. (Coaches-1)
Dion Bailey, USC (Coaches-2)

Special teams

Placekickers
Zane Gonzales, Arizona St. (Coaches-1)
Vincenzo D'Amato, California (Coaches-2)

Punters
Tom Hackett, Utah (Coaches-1)
Travis Coons, Washington (Coaches-2)

Return specialists 
Ty Montgomery, Stanford (Coaches-1)
Nelson Agholor, USC (Coaches-2)

Special teams player
Soma Vainuku, USC (Coaches-1)
Erick Dargan, Oregon (Coaches-2)
Joe Hemschoot, Stanford (Coaches-2)
Ryan Hoffmeister, UCLA (Coaches-2)

Key

Coaches = selected by the Pac-12 coaches

See also
2013 College Football All-America Team

References

All-Pac-12 Conference Football Team
All-Pac-12 Conference football teams